Peter Richardson (born 24 June 1970) is a retired British boxer.

Boxing career
He competed in the men's light welterweight event at the 1992 Summer Olympics. He beat Vernon Forrest in the first round.

He represented England in the lightweight division, at the 1990 Commonwealth Games in Auckland, New Zealand and reached the quarter finals. Four years later he won the gold medal at the 1994 Commonwealth Games.

Boxing for the Philip Thomas School of Boxing ABC, Richardson won the prestigious ABA featherweight championship in 1989. Four years later he won the 1993 ABA light-welterweight championship.

References

External links
 

1970 births
Living people
British male boxers
Olympic boxers of Great Britain
Boxers at the 1992 Summer Olympics
Boxers at the 1986 Commonwealth Games
Boxers at the 1990 Commonwealth Games
Commonwealth Games gold medallists for England
Commonwealth Games medallists in boxing
Boxers at the 1994 Commonwealth Games
Sportspeople from Middlesbrough
Light-welterweight boxers
Medallists at the 1994 Commonwealth Games